Pinewoods, also known as Warburton House, is a historic home located near Lightfoot, James City County, Virginia. The house dates to the late-17th century, and is a -story, early Colonial brick dwelling.  It has a gable roof with dormers and features two very fine T-shaped chimney stacks.

Edmund Ware Warburton (1861–1919) was for a long time a member of the James City school board; from 1899 to 1904 he was a member of the Williamsburg city council and twice mayor of the city.

It was listed on the National Register of Historic Places in 1971.

See also
List of the oldest buildings in Virginia

References

External links
 Warburton House, Pinewoods Pond vicinity, Lightfoot, James City County, VA: 3 photos at Historic American Buildings Survey

Houses on the National Register of Historic Places in Virginia
Colonial architecture in Virginia
Houses in James City County, Virginia
National Register of Historic Places in James City County, Virginia
Historic American Buildings Survey in Virginia